Foje was one of the most successful and best known rock bands in Lithuania.

History  
Foje was formed in the present-day Antakalnis Secondary School in Vilnius by Andrius Mamontovas, Arnoldas Lukošius and Darius Tarasevičius in 1983 under the name of Sunki Muzika ("Hard Music"), few months later Algis Kriščiūnas joined the band. In 1984 it was renamed to Foje (literal meaning: "foyer"). Through its years, the band survived a number of lineup changes, and released over 10 albums. 

The group cited several influences, including the sound of the Stranglers, as well as the 1980s post-punk movement (for example the notable nod to Depeche Mode on Foje's 1989 electronica album Žodžiai į Tylą). These influences were combined with the often gloomy, desperate lyrics of the band's leader Andrius Mamontovas.

In 1997 the band performed three farewell gigs in the Lithuanian cities of Klaipėda, Kaunas and Vilnius, with attendance of 60,000 in the final performance on 17 May in Vingis Park of Vilnius. After disbanding Mamontovas started a solo career.

Two of the band's songs - "Laužo šviesa" ("The Light of the Bonfire") (1986) and "Meilės nebus per daug" ("There will not be too much love") (1994) - were voted by the media professionals into the Top 20 best Lithuanian songs of the 20th century in 2000.

Members

Andrius Mamontovas (1983–1997) - Vocals, guitar, drums, keyboards
Arnoldas Lukošius (1983–1989, 1992–1997) - Keyboards, accordion
Algis Kriščiūnas  (1983–1985, 1992–1997) - Drums
Darius Burokas (1986–1988, 1990–1997) - Bass, keyboards
Darius Tarasevičius (1983–1985) - Bass
Romas Rainys (1985–1988) Bass, Guitar
Eugenijus Pugačiukas (1985–1991) - Drums
Saulius Valikonis (1986–1988, 1989–1991) - Saxophone
Gediminas Simniškis (1988–1989) - Bass
Jaunius Beinortas (1988–1989) - Guitar
Robertas Meržvinskas (1988–1989) - Saxophone
Robertas Griškevičius (1989–1990) - Keyboards

Discography

1989 - Geltoni krantai (Yellow Shores) (MC)
1990 - Žodžiai į tylą (Words Into Silence) (LP, MC)
1991 - Gali skambėti keistai (It Might Sound Strange) (LP, CD, MC) - first CD album in Lithuanian music history
1992 - Kitoks pasaulis (A Different World) (LP, CD, MC)
1993 - Vandenyje (In The Water) (LP, CD, MC)
1994 - Tikras garsas (The Real Sound) (MC)
1994 - M-1 (dancemixes) (CD, MC)
1994 - Aš čia esu (I Am Here) (MC)
1994 - Aš čia esu (LP Picture Disc)
1995 - Kai perplauksi upę (When You Swim Across The River) (CD, MC)
1995 - Live On The Air (MC)
1996 - 1982 (MC, CD)
1997 - The Flowing River EP (CD)
1997 - Mokykla (School) (MC)
1999 - Vilnius - Kaunas - Klaipėda (CD, MC)
2002 - Paveikslas (The Picture) (CD, MC)
2006 - Kita paveikslo pusė (The Other Side of the Picture) (CD)
2013 - AM+FOJE=30 (AM - Andrius Mamontovas) (CD)

References

External links
Foje official website 

Lithuanian rock music groups
Musical groups established in 1983
Musical groups disestablished in 1997
1983 establishments in Lithuania
1983 establishments in the Soviet Union
1997 disestablishments in Lithuania
Music in Vilnius
Soviet rock music groups